Miss Charm 2023 was the 1st edition of the Miss Charm pageant, held at the Hoa Binh Theater in Ho Chi Minh City, Vietnam on February 16, 2023.

Luma Russo of Brazil bested 37 contestants, and was crowned as Miss Charm 2023 at the end of the event. This 27-year-old woman became the first winner of this contest and the first woman from Brazil to win the Miss Charm title. She is entitled to a prize of $100,000.

Contestants from 38 countries and territories participated in this year's pageant. The pageant was hosted by Phương Mai, Quỳnh Nga and Karina Ramos.

Background

Miss Charm was officially launched in a press conference on October 8, 2019 under the name Miss Charm International. The first contest will be held on March 17, 2020 in Ho Chi Minh City, Vietnam. However, due to the COVID-19 pandemic in Vietnam, it was announced on February 27, 2020 that the first issue would be postponed. On March 29, 2021, the contest was rescheduled to be held on October 1, 2021, but due to Covid-19 pandemic the contest was postponed to April 24, 2022, however the contest was cancelled.

On November 17, 2022, in another press conference held at Lotte Hotel Saigon, the Miss Charm Organization announced that the pageant would be held on February 16, 2023 in Ho Chi Minh City, Vietnam. The Hoa Binh Theater became the venue of final coronation.

Results

Placements

 – Voted into the Top 10 via viewers (Miss BlockCharm)

Special awards

Order of Announcements

Top 20

 

Top 10

 
Top 6

Top 3

Pageant

Swimsuit Competition
The swimsuit competition was held on February 9, 2023 at Lotte Hotel Saigon by Fizen, which was named "The Spring Beach". Miss Fizen was awarded to Juliana Habib of Colombia.

Miss BlockCharm
For the first time in beauty pageant history, online voting would be done using blockchain technology, hence the online voting round called Miss BlockCharm. Olivia Tan of Indonesia was eventually awarded Miss BlockCharm at the afterparty.

Preliminary round
Prior to the final competition, the contestants competed in a preliminary competition, which involved closed-door interviews with the judges and a presentation show where they competed in ao dai, national costume, swimwear and evening gowns and was held in BHD Studio on 13 February, hosted by Karina Ramos.

Finals
The results of the preliminary competition, which consisted of swimsuit and evening dress competitions, as well as closed interviews, determined the 20 selected semifinalists. The winner of Miss BlockCharm will advance to the top 10. The top 20 compete in the swimsuit competition and are narrowed down to the top 10 afterward. The top 10 competed in an evening gown competition and narrowed down to the top 6 afterward. The top 6 competed in a question and answer preliminary round, and the final 3 were chosen. The final word piece was brought back, after which Miss Charm 2023 and its two runners-up were announced.

Judges
 Nguyễn Thị Thúy Nga – President of the Miss Charm Organization
 Natalie Glebova – Miss Universe 2005 from Canada
 Mireia Lalaguna – Miss World 2015 from Spain
 Ikumi Yoshimatsu – Miss International 2012 from Japan
 Trần Ngọc Lan Khuê – Vietnamese model and Miss World Vietnam 2015
 Mimi Morris – Vietnamese-American businesswoman and philanthropist
 Irene Zhao – Singaporean model and influencer

Contestants 
38 contestants competed for the title:

Notes

References

External links 
Official website

Miss Charm
Miss Charm
Miss Charm